Coca alkaloids are the alkaloids found in the coca plant, Erythroxylum coca. They are predominantly of either the pyrrolidine or the tropane types.


Tropane-type alkaloids 
 Benzoylecgonine
 Cocaine
 Ecgonidine
 Ecgonine
 Hydroxytropacocaine
 Methylecgonine cinnamate
 Tropacocaine
 Truxilline

Pyrrolidine-type alkaloids 
 Cuscohygrine
 Dihydrocuscohygrine
 Hygrine
 Nicotine

See also 
 Cocaine metabolites (Human)
 Coca wine, an alcoholic beverage combining wine with extracted coca alkaloids
 Methylecgonidine
 Troparil

References